Spanking the Monkey is a 1994 American sick comedy film written and directed by David O. Russell. It was filmed in Pawling, New York.

Plot
Ray Aibelli has finished his first year of college at the Massachusetts Institute of Technology and has received a prestigious summer medical internship which he has to forego to take care of his mother, Susan Aibelli, a married, lonely woman, who has suffered a leg injury at home just as her husband is about to leave on his job as a traveling salesman. Ray's relationship with his father is seen to be troubled as his father is overly controlling. The relationship between Susan and Mr. Aibelli is also shown to be suffering because he is later shown to be cheating with prostitutes and Susan feels disappointed by her lack of achievement in life.

Ray has to take care of his mother by helping her to shower and massaging her legs leading to him seeing her naked and experiencing a moment of intimacy when he massages her upper thigh. He feels extreme guilt for his incestuous sexual feelings and rubs his skin raw to punish himself. His sexual frustration is increased due to the fact that he is unable to masturbate, due to the family's dog repeatedly interrupting him. His high school friends are shown to be immature and Ray is seen to feel increasingly isolated from them. He also begins a relationship with local teenager Toni Peck whom he struggles to communicate with both socially and when having sex, leading to her rebuffing him.

Ray explains to his mother how their sexual encounter developed and she offers him sexual advice and he later openly stares at her body in the shower, increasing their physical intimacy. Ray has an opportunity to leave his mother behind when his aunt, Helen, offers to be her caretaker and he excitedly prepares to leave the next day. Both Ray and Susan are annoyed by Helen and they have a sexual encounter late at night that leads to Ray missing his bus the next day. Ray's father informs him that he will no longer be able to pay for his university tuition causing him to become even more stressed about his future.

Toni and Ray are seen to have resumed their sexual relationship and are kissing when Susan interrupts them, she slaps Toni and injures her. Ray and Susan have a loud argument that quickly devolves into groping and kissing. Toni's father comes to their house to complain but Susan is able to flirt with him and prevent him from punishing Ray.

Ray attempts to commit suicide by hanging himself from the bathroom door but Susan interrupts him, he complains that he can't achieve anything here and attempts to initiate sexual contact with Susan. He kisses her passionately but then pulls back and attempts to strangle her to death before stopping. His friends invite him to hang out with them again and he accepts joining them near the river. After being provoked by one of his friends he jumps off a steep cliff and is seen hitching a ride with a truck driver early the next morning.

Cast
 Jeremy Davies as Raymond "Ray" Aibelli
 Alberta Watson as Susan Aibelli
 Benjamin Hendrickson as Tom Aibelli
 Carla Gallo as Toni Peck
 Judette Jones as Aunt Helen
 Matthew Puckett as Nicky
 Zak Orth as Curtis
 Josh Philip Weinstein as Joel
 Judah Domke as Don
 Nancy Fields as Dr. Wilson

Music
Select tracks from Morphine's album Cure for Pain are used throughout the film, including "In Spite of Me" which plays over the end credits.

Reception
Spanking the Monkey was a box office success, grossing $1,359,736 on a $200,000 budget.

On Rotten Tomatoes, the film has an approval rating of 92% based on reviews from 26 critics. The site's consensus states: "David O. Russell's feature debut scores with an endearing cast and offbeat humor, finding compelling sweetness in perverse places." On Metacritic it has a score of 66% based on reviews from 15 critics.

The film won the Audience Award at the 1994 Sundance Film Festival and the Independent Spirit Award for Best First Screenplay.

Year-end lists 
 6th – Bob Strauss, Los Angeles Daily News
 6th – Douglas Armstrong, The Milwaukee Journal
 10th – Peter Travers, Rolling Stone
 10th – Todd Anthony, Miami New Times
 Top 10 (listed alphabetically, not ranked) – Jimmy Fowler, Dallas Observer
 Top 10 runner-ups (not ranked) – Janet Maslin, The New York Times
 Honorable mention –  Glenn Lovell, San Jose Mercury News

References

External links
 
 
 
 

1994 films
1994 comedy-drama films
Adultery in films
American black comedy films
American comedy-drama films
1990s English-language films
Films about dysfunctional families
Films directed by David O. Russell
Films shot in New York (state)
Incest in film
American independent films
1994 independent films
Sundance Film Festival award winners
1994 directorial debut films
1990s American films